A bonbon is a small chocolate confection. They are usually filled with liqueur or other sweet alcoholic ingredients, and sold wrapped in coloured foil.

Ingredients
Through the Western world, bonbons are usually small candies but vary by region in their ingredients, flavours, and shape. In France, bonbons have been made with a fruit centre, and may contain brittle, nougat, dragée, or caramel. Other possible fillings include butterscotch, fondant, fudge, ganache, gianduja, marzipan, praline, and truffle.

According to French law, a  must be at least 25% chocolate and can come in several forms:
 a bite-sized chocolate;
 an arrangement of different chocolates;
 a mixture of chocolate and other edible ingredients.

Specifically in the United States, the phrase "Bon Bon" refers to The Hershey Company's trademarked name for a frozen confection made from vanilla ice cream and covered in chocolate.

Etymology and history
The word "bonbon" arose from the reduplication of the word bon, meaning "good" in the French language. Its use originated in the seventeenth century within the French royal court and spread to other European countries by the eighteenth century. Bonbons began to be served in ornate containers by the middle of the eighteenth century, which would be given as gifts at festivals and on holidays such as New Year's Day.

Johann Strauss II wrote the waltz Wiener Bonbons in 1866. The title page shows the composition's name in the form of twisted bonbon wrappers.

See also
 Pralines

References

Candy
Chocolate confectionery
Chocolate-covered foods